State Trunk Highway 184 (often called Highway 184, STH-184 or WIS 184) was a state highway in the U.S. state of Wisconsin. It ran north–south between Footville and Fulton. In 1999, the road was turned over to Rock County, which maintains it as County Trunk Highway H (CTH-H).

Route description
WIS 184 began at a junction with WIS 11 east of Footville. The highway headed north to Leyden, where it intersected U.S. Route 14. WIS 184 continued north from here to the community of Fulton, passing near the Rock River. The route terminated north of Fulton at WIS 59. The highway was located entirely within Rock County.

History
WIS 184 was designated in 1947 in Rock County when  of CTH-H were turned over to the state. The highway's routing was not changed during its existence. On October 4, 1999, the highway was transferred back to the county and once again renamed CTH-H.

Major intersections

See also

References

184
Transportation in Rock County, Wisconsin